Leaf & Love is a brand of organic lemonade marketed toward families as a natural, sugar-free alternative to typical juice box drinks for children. It is produced by Leaf & Love, Inc., a company based in Studio City, California.

History
Leaf & Love was co-founded in 2014 by Amy Stewart DiBianca, an actress, and Sara Williams-Curran, an educator and school administrator. Both women were mothers of young children, one of whom suffered from Type 1 Diabetes, which helped to inspire the creation of a healthy, sugar-free alternative to traditional juice boxes.

Product
Leaf & Love Organic Lemonade is billed as "the first and only all-natural, USDA organic, zero-sugar lemonade juice box for kids." The drink is sweetened with stevia, and also appeals to health-conscious consumers as gluten-free, non-GMO, and vegan. The drink's nutritional information indicates five calories per serving, and a total of five ingredients.

Notes

References

Juice brands
Products introduced in 2014